Tracey Ann Barnes (born 28 June 1975) is a Jamaican sprinter. She competed in the women's 4 × 400 metres relay at the 1996 Summer Olympics.

References

External links
 

1975 births
Living people
Athletes (track and field) at the 1996 Summer Olympics
Jamaican female sprinters
Olympic athletes of Jamaica
Goodwill Games medalists in athletics
Place of birth missing (living people)
Competitors at the 1998 Goodwill Games
Central American and Caribbean Games medalists in athletics
Olympic female sprinters
20th-century Jamaican women